Kate Porter (born 19 April 1983) is a former Australian rugby union player. She represented  at the 2006, and 2010 Women's Rugby World Cup where they finished in third place.

Porter also played in the 2006 Rugby World Cup in Canada. In October 2007, she was named in the Wallaroos squad for the two-Test series against New Zealand.

Porter is an Army Major in the Australian Defence Force.

References

1983 births
Living people
Australia women's international rugby union players
Australian female rugby union players
Female rugby union players
20th-century Australian women
21st-century Australian women